Rebecca Borga (born 11 June 1998) is an Italian sprinter, specialized in the 400 metres. She competed at the 2020 Summer Olympics, in 4 × 400 m relay.

Biography
At senior level Borga won a bronze medal with the 4x400m relay team in the European Athletics Team Championships (2019) and an Italian indoor title in the 400m (2021). At the under-23 level, she boasts two medals at the Mediterranean Games (2018).

Achievements
Senior level

National records
 4x400 metres relay indoor: 3:30.32 ( Toruń, 7 March 2021 with Eloisa Coiro, Alice Mangione, Eleonora Marchiando) Current holder

National titles
 Italian Athletics Indoor Championships
 400 metres: 2021

See also
 Italian national track relay team

References

External links
 

1998 births
Athletics competitors of Fiamme Gialle
Italian female sprinters
Living people
Sportspeople from Treviso
Italian Athletics Championships winners
Athletes (track and field) at the 2020 Summer Olympics
Olympic athletes of Italy